The Young Israel Philharmonic Orchestra (YIPO) is the national youth orchestra of Israel, based in the Jerusalem Music Centre, Jerusalem. It consists of 140 members divided into two ensembles, a 40-member string ensemble for ages 11–14, and the larger 100-member symphony orchestra for ages 14–18.

Over 90% of the Young Israel Philharmonic Orchestra's graduates go on to higher education in music, with many taking up prominent positions in the Israel Philharmonic Orchestra.

It is an associated member of the European Federation of National Youth Orchestras.

See also 
 List of youth orchestras

References 

Music education organizations
National youth orchestras
Israeli orchestras
Musical groups established in 1984